Carski Rez (short: CRZ, Cyrillic: Царски Рез) is an independent Serbian hip hop label from Belgrade formed in 2006 by Blokovski, Mauzer and Kuer, who make up the group Arhitekti. Carski Rez literally translates into English as caesarean cut, but generally means caesarean section, or c-section in Serbian.

The label has a roster of fifteen artists based in four countries: Serbia, Austria, Canada and Switzerland. With fifteen official releases, it is one of the most prolific labels on the Serbian hip hop scene. Although independent, Carski Rez has occasionally partnered with other music labels (namely Magmedia, owned by the rapper Škabo from Beogradski sindikat) for distribution deals.

Besides its creative output, Carski Rez also offers production services and a professional recording studio.

History

Beginnings 

When Blokovski (formerly known as Kajblo Spirit), Mauzer (formerly Rastamon) and Kuer formed the group Arhitekti in 2005, they had already garnered a reputation on Serbia's hip hop scene as solo artists. Kajblo Spirit had previously released a demo album, Čekanje je mučno (Waiting is painful).

The group decided to pursue the independent route due to the relatively low popularity of hip hop music in Serbia at the time, and consequently a reluctance on the part of established record labels to promote this genre. May 11, 2006 has entered Carski Rez lore as the official birthdate of the label.

New members were added shortly thereafter – MC and producer Mothaphonkin Mjan from Novi Beograd, and a producer-MC duo called Sqb & The Easst from the Žarkovo neighborhood of Belgrade, were all previous collaborators of Blokovski (Mjan appears on Blokovski's pre-Carski Rez album Čekanje je mučno). Sqb & The Easst had been members of another group together, but began working exclusively together after that group disbanded.

Arhitekti performed together with fellow Serbian underground hip hop groups Bauk Skquad and FTP at the Exit 06 music festival in Novi Sad in July 2006. Since then, artists from the label have performed at numerous hip hop events in Belgrade, Novi Sad and Banja Luka.

First Expansion 

The end of 2006 saw a Carski Rez expansion in several ways. Upgraded recording equipment and the official website were set up, two new artists (Ask and Mirage) from Novi Sad were added and the label went global with the addition of the Babble Goons (a duo of HighDuke and Skrajb) from Ottawa, Canada and the multi-talented MC/producer/DJ Baron residing in Switzerland.

The work of this international cast was greatly facilitated by Rad i Vizija, a website dedicated to Serbian hip hop and which served as a forum for the exchange of music when other avenues for this did not yet exist in Serbia. Baron and Skrajb had previously collaborated on several songs after establishing contact via Rad i Vizija. Baron had also gathered critical acclaim from the underground hip hop scene for his self-released 2003 album Publika Bezbednosti. His dark and multi-layered sample based sound earned him comparisons to New York indie label Def Jux.

Third Wave to Present Day 

The opening of the official Carski Rez studio in 2007 in Banovo Brdo marked a new chapter in the label's work. Two years after their collective beginning, Arhitekti released their first album, “Arhitekti EP” whose lead single Mrzim (I Hate) received moderate airplay on Serbian radio stations. Four months later Blokovski released his third solo effort, Oblici od Oblaka deo 1 (Cloud Shapes Pt. 1) which was voted as the best demo album of the year by visitors of Rad I Vizija, now Serbia's premier hip hop resource on the internet.

Following the release of the Babble Goons album Critical Condition, Skrajb left the group, but continues with Carski Rez as a solo artist. Taking his place are MCs Earthquake Slick and Bigavac, and DJ Grusm, the only member of Carski Rez who is not of Serbian descent. They continue to perform in Ottawa and are currently working on a new album.

Another addition to the list of Carski Rez artists is Grema Dži, an MC and producer from Austria, who did most of the mastering work on the Babble Goons album. He also owns and runs Maximal Studios, a professional recording studio in Vienna.

In 2008, Oblici od Oblaka deo 2 (Cloud Shapes Pt. 2) repeated the success of its predececor, earning Blokovski another demo album of the year title at Rad I Vizija, while the album's leading single "Ha Ha" was voted best demo song (Sqb & The Easst also found themselves in the final round). Skubi's side project “Skubi predstavlja Gazda Paju” (Skubi Presents: Gazda Paja – Funk'd Up) was voted as the year's best EP.

June 2008 saw the first nationwide release of a Carski Rez album, a compilation featuring all of the label's artists and titled “Rez 1” in cooperation with the music label Magmedia. This release allowed for new exposure, including two critically acclaimed singles from the album, “Kosmos” by Skubi & The Easst and “Gengsta Fank” by Mothaphonkin Mjan.

The year ended with another addition to the list of artists – Supreme, from Zaječar, who recorded "Samo Lagano" with Blokovski soon after.

Carski Rez remains active with several new releases in 2010. and 2011, of which Blokovski and his album "Prototip" was the most noted.

Current List of Artists 

Blokovski (MC, Belgrade)
Mauzer (MC, Belgrade)
Kuer (producer, Belgrade)
Mjandžizl (aka Mothaphonkin Mjan), (producer, MC, Belgrade)
The Easst (MC, Belgrade)
Skubi (producer, Belgrade)
Ask (MC, Novi Sad)
Mirage (MC, Novi Sad)
Supreme (MC, Zaječar)
Baron (MC, producer, DJ, Schaffhausen, Switzerland)
Grema (MC, producer, Vienna, Austria).
Skrajb (MC, Ottawa, Canada)
Earthquake Slick (MC, Ottawa, Canada)
Bigavac (MC, Ottawa, Canada)
HighDuke (MC, producer, Ottawa, Canada)
DJ Grusm (DJ, Ottawa, Canada)

Discography 

Carski Rez releases generally fall into one of four categories: Albums are available either as free downloads, or in retail. In between, some albums are offered both as free downloads or as retail CD's. Finally, there is a series of Promo CD's released annually, which are not sold but handed out for free at various events. The type of release is noted in the brackets along with the year.

Kajblo Spirit – Čekanje je mučno (2005, retail)
Spirit Blokovski – Oproštaj od lošeg snimka (2006, retail)
Madafankinmjan – Ritam, Priča, Bas, Fank (2006, retail)
Carski rez - Promo 1 (2006, free CD)
Miraž - Sinkretizam 16 (2006, retail)
Arhitekti – EP (2007, retail)
Spirit Blokovski – Oblici od oblaka deo 1. (2007, free download/retail)
Babble Goons - Critical Condition (2007, retail)
Carski rez – Promo 2 (2007, free CD)
Skubi predstavlja Gazda Paju - FUNK'D UP (2008, free download/retail)
Spirit Blokovski – Oblici od Oblaka deo 2. (2008, retail/free download)
Carski Rez – Rez 1. (Carski Rez/Magmedija) (2008, retail)
Baron – The Re-Cuts (2008, free download)
Carski Rez – Promo 3 (2009, free CD)
Skubi in the DJ Rokam's Mix (2009, free download)
 Supreme & Blokovski – Samo Lagano (2009, free download)
 Mauzer - Carski Kobazz (2009, free download)
 DJ Dust & Blokovski - Мој друже (2009, free download)
 Crz Instrumentals 1 (2009, free download)
 Skubi - Bonus Trake (2009, retail)
 The Easst - Koga Briga (2010, free download)
 Blokovski i AC3PO - Hologram RMX EP (2010, free download) 
 Baron - Publika Bezbednosti: RELOADED (2010, free download) 
 ILL G, Skubi, DJ Rokam - Sta Ima (2010, CD) 
 DJ Kobazz i Skubi - SKUBAZZ! umiksovana kaseta vol.1 (2010, free download) 
Blokovski - Ko sam ja (2010, free download) 
Carski Rez – Promo 4 (2010, free cd)
Skubi - АЕ (2010, free download)
Blokovski - Dete sa loptom uvek nađe društvo za igru (2011, free CD)
Blokovski - Prototip (2011, retail)

References 

Note: All references are in Serbian.

External links

Note: All links leading to Serbian web pages
 Carski Rez Interview (Domino Magazine)
 Interview with Blokovski (Serbian Underground)
 Interview with Kuer (Rad i Vizija)
 Arhitekti EP review, (Popboks)

Hip hop record labels
Serbian hip hop